The Soul Train Music Awards is an annual music awards show which previously aired in national broadcast syndication, and honors the best in African-American culture, music and entertainment.  It is produced by the makers of Soul Train, the program from which it takes its name, and features musical performances by various contemporary R&B and soul music recording artists interspersed throughout the ceremonies. The special traditionally used to air in either February, March or April, but now airs the last weekend of November (in most years, Thanksgiving weekend).

The Soul Train Music Awards voting body includes active professionals in the fields of radio programming and music retail and management and recording artists with records that have charted in designated music trade publications in the year prior to proceedings. Past hosts for the show include such R&B luminaries as Luther Vandross, Dionne Warwick, Patti LaBelle, Will Smith, Vanessa Williams, Taraji P. Henson, and Gladys Knight.

The Soul Train Music Award trophy has featured an African ceremonial mask since its 1987 introduction. A new trophy was designed by Tristan Eaton of Thunderdog Studios in 2009 and is manufactured by New York firm Society Awards. From 1995 to 2005 a separate award show named Soul Train Lady of Soul Awards was held, honoring female artists.

History
The 2008 ceremonies were not held due to several factors, including the 2007–08 Writers Guild of America strike, the ill health of Don Cornelius at the time, and Soul Train distributor Tribune Entertainment terminating operations in the wake of the sale of Tribune Media to Sam Zell. With the rights to Soul Train acquired by MadVision Entertainment, the Soul Train Music Awards were presented on November 24, 2009 on BET Her.  MadVision now holds the rerun rights to Soul Train.

The 2009 ceremony was held at the Georgia World Congress Center in Atlanta, marking the first time in the show's 22-year history it was held outside of the Greater Los Angeles.  The 2010 awards was held on November 10 just outside Atlanta at the Cobb Energy Performing Arts Centre, and aired November 28. The 2011 show was once again held in Atlanta and aired November 27. The 2012 ceremony was held live on November 25 at Planet Hollywood Las Vegas in Las Vegas Valley, Nevada. As of 2019, Beyoncé is the most-awarded artist at the Soul Train Music Awards with 16 awards.

Ceremonies

Soul Cypher
In 2015, host Erykah Badu added a new tradition to the award show, the Soul Cypher. Similar to a Hip-Hop cypher, it features a quartet of R&B/Soul/Gospel singers coming together to perform a freestyle. Accompanied by an instrumental beat and a live band, the artists deliver a freestyle arrangement by incorporating lyrics, hooks and/or titles from their popular hits. A UK version of the Soul Cypher was introduced during the 2020 broadcast.

UK Soul Cypher

Trophy
The original trophy is a bronze abstract sitting figure known as the Vanguard in 1987. However, the trophy is an African mask which is known as the Heritage Award. Its distinctive design created by an unknown sculptor, but its remains a visual trademark for Soul Train's representation of Black music.

From 1989 to 2007, the Heritage mask remained the trophy for Soul Train Music Awards until 2009 when BET and its sister channel Centric revived the awards. Thunderdog designed a brand new trophy based on the program's mascot, an actual train.

Award categories

Main awards

 Album of the Year
 Video of the Year
 Song of the Year
 The Ashford & Simpson Songwriter's Award
 Best New Artist
 Rhythm & Bars Award
 Best R&B/Soul Male Artist
 Best R&B/Soul Female Artist
 Best Dance Performance
 Best Gospel/Inspirational Song
 Best Collaboration
 Certified Award, formerly Centric Award

Special awards
 Soul Train Music Award for Quincy Jones Award for Career Achievement
 Soul Train Music Award for Heritage Award - Career Achievement
 Soul Train Music Award for Sammy Davis Jr. - Entertainer of the Year
 Artist of the Decade Award for Extraordinary Artistic Achievements
 Soul Train Music Award for Stevie Wonder Award for Outstanding Achievement in Songwriting

Defunct award categories

 Best Gospel Album
 Best Gospel Album – Group or Band
 Best Gospel Album – Solo
 Best Jazz Album
 Best Jazz Album – Group, Band or Duo
 Best Jazz Album – Solo
 Best Rap Single
 Best Rap Album
 Best R&B/Soul Album – Male
 Best R&B/Soul Album – Female
 Best R&B/Soul Album – Group, Band or Duo
 Best R&B/Soul Single – Male
 Best R&B/Soul Single – Female
 Best R&B/Soul Single – Group, Band or Duo
 The Sprite Award for Best R&B/Soul or Rap Dance Cut

Most Awarded Artists

References

External links
 Soul Train Awards Official Site
 Soul Train Official Site

 
American music awards
Performing arts trophies
Awards established in 1987
Television series by Tribune Entertainment